David Borrero (born December 14, 1988) is an American politician serving as a member of the Florida House of Representatives from the 105th district. He assumed office on November 3, 2020.

Early life and education 
Borrero was born in Queens, New York City in 1988. He earned a Bachelor of Arts degree in political science and economics from Florida International University, a Master of Business Administration from the Florida International University College of Business, and a Juris Doctor from St. Thomas University School of Law.

Career 
From 2010 to 2016, Borrero worked as a grants manager for the city of Sweetwater, Florida. In 2016, he was the campaign manager for Carlos Trujillo's successful re-election campaign to the Florida House of Representatives. Borrero joined T&G Constructors as an account executive in 2017. He has also served as a member of the Sweetwater City Commission. He was elected to the Florida House of Representatives in November 2020.

References 

1988 births
People from Queens, New York
Florida International University alumni
St. Thomas University (Florida) alumni
Republican Party members of the Florida House of Representatives
Hispanic and Latino American state legislators in Florida
21st-century American politicians
Living people